The Cuerpo de Seguridad y Asalto was the heavy reserve force of the blue-uniformed urban police force of Spain during the Spanish Second Republic. The Assault Guards were special police and paramilitary units created by the Spanish Republic in 1931 to deal with urban and political violence. Most of the recruits in the Assault Guards were ex-military personnel, many of which were veterans.

At the onset of the Spanish Civil War there were 18,000 Assault Guards. About 12,000 stayed loyal to the Republican government, while another 5,000 joined the rebel faction. Many of its units fought against the Franco supporting armies and their allies. Their siding with the former Spanish Republic's government brought about the disbandment of the corps at the end of the Civil War. The members of the Guardia de Asalto who had survived the war and the ensuing Francoist purges were made part of the Policía Armada, the corps that replaced it.<ref>[http://www.march.es/ceacs/biblioteca/proyectos/linz/Documento.asp?Reg=r-54595 Farrás, Salvador. Fuerzas de orden público y transición política (y II). La Policía Armada]. Diario 16. 25/10/1977.]</ref>

 Origins 
Following the overthrow of the Spanish Monarchy in April 1931, the new Republican regime created the Guardia de Asalto as a gendarmerie style national armed police that could be used to suppress disorders in urban areas. Armed and trained for this purpose, the Guardia de Asalto was intended to provide a more effective force for internal security duties than the ordinary police or the conscription-based army. Since its creation in 1844 the 25,000 strong Guardia Civil had been available to be ordered into the larger cities in the event of unrest, but this efficient rural force —its officers drawn from the regular army and with an oppressive image— was not seen as being in sympathy with the new Republic or particularly suited for urban operations.

The Ministro de la Gobernación Miguel Maura accordingly reorganized elements of the existing police into a more heavily armed republican security force for service in the cities, leaving the countryside to the Guardia Civil. As an initial step Compañías de Vanguardia (Vanguard Companies) were created in the principal urban areas. These were subsequently redesignated as Sección de guardias de Asalto. As a part of the reformed Cuerpo de Seguridad they provided an instrument for controlling mass demonstrations; similar in function to modern riot squads. In 1932, the Cuerpo de Seguridad was renamed as the Cuerpo de Seguridad y Asalto.

 The Spanish Civil War 
Of all the police forces that had remained in the government zone, the Assault Guard was the best seen by most of the population. This made a large number of soldiers decide to join this body; to avoid misgivings and suspicions that military affiliation created among the workers' militias. This fact reached the point that the President of the Ministry of War, Largo Caballero, had to prohibit Army officers from joining the Assault Guard without authorization from the Ministry of War. The Assault Guards distinguished themselves as a reliable and shock infantry to which the Republic always entrusted its most delicate operations, such as the battles of Madrid and Guadalajara, the securing of Belchite, and the suppression of the events in Barcelona during May. Later in the war, the Assault Corps became the elite of the Spanish Republican Army. The writer George Orwell reflected it in one of his most outstanding works:

The Carabineros (frontier guards) and the Assault Guards were the Spanish police and paramilitary corps where the 1936 coup found the least support. When the Civil War began, over 70% of the Assault Guards stayed loyal to the Spanish Republic. On the other hand, in the Guardia Civil the breakup of loyalists and rebels was distributed evenly at around 50%, although the highest authority of the corps, Inspector General Sebastián Pozas, remained loyal to the republican government.

 Ranks 
Before the Civil War, eight-pointed and six-pointed silver stars were part of the officers' uniforms of the Guardias de Asalto. Following the breakout of the Civil War, and the ensuing reorganization of the Spanish Republican Armed Forces some changes were introduced and ranks were simplified.

The silver 8-pointed and six-pointed stars that had been worn between 1931 and 1936 were replaced by the five pointed red star.

 Officers 

 Non-commissioned ranks 

 Officers (Civil War)

 Non-commissioned ranks (Civil War)

See alsoCarabinerosGuardia Civil''
Spanish Republican Army

References

Works cited

External links

History section of Subinspector Cartujo's personal page

Military history of Spain
Defunct law enforcement agencies of Spain
1939 disestablishments in Spain
Armed Forces of the Second Spanish Republic